Henry Burton Shipley (born 10 May 1996) is a New Zealand cricketer who plays for Canterbury.

Domestic career
He made his List A debut on 17 January 2016 in the 2015–16 Ford Trophy. He made his first-class debut on 22 October 2016 in the 2016–17 Plunket Shield season. In June 2018, he was awarded a contract with Canterbury for the 2018–19 season. He made his Twenty20 debut for Canterbury in the 2018–19 Super Smash on 23 December 2018.

In June 2020, he was offered a contract by Canterbury ahead of the 2020–21 domestic cricket season.

International career
Shipley made his ODI debut against Pakistan in January 2023.

Personal life and family
His father James, appeared in one match for Canterbury as 12th man in 1985. He is a second cousin of Burton Shipley, the husband of former Prime Minister Jenny Shipley, and has the middle name Burton after him. His uncle, Mark Priest, also played cricket for Canterbury and New Zealand.

References

External links
 

1996 births
Living people
New Zealand cricketers
Canterbury cricketers
People from Darfield, New Zealand
Cricketers from Canterbury, New Zealand